Max Raoul or Vandière, real name Raoul François Chapais, (c.1770 – Paris 5 March 1839) was a 19th-century French playwright.

A former employee at the customs in Rouen, his plays were presented on several Parisian stages of the 19th century, including the Théâtre du Palais-Royal, the Théâtre du Gymnase-Dramatique, and the Théâtre du Vaudeville.

Works 
1804: La Voix du parterre
1817: L'Original et la copie, tales
1821: L'Amant bossu, comédie-vaudeville in 1 act, with Eugène Scribe and Mélesville
1827: Recette pour marier sa fille, comédie-vaudeville in 1 act, with Mélesville
1832: Une Affaire d'honneur, comédie-vaudeville in 1 act
1832: La Prise de voile, drama in 2 acts, mingled with songs
1834: Le Château d'Urtuby, opéra comique in 1 act, with Gabriel de Lurieu and Henri-Montan Berton
1835: Dolly ou Le cœur d'une femme, drama in 3 acts, with Thomas Sauvage and de Lurieu
1839: Mme de Brienne, drama in 2 acts, with Saint-Yves

Bibliography 
 Joseph Marie Quérard, Les supercheries littéraires dévoilées: Galérie des auteurs apocryphes, 1847, 
 J-M Quérard, La France littéraire, 1857,  

19th-century French dramatists and playwrights
Year of birth missing
1839 deaths